Dundalk Upper is a barony in County Louth, Republic of Ireland.

Etymology
Dundalk Upper is named after the town of Dundalk (Irish: Dún Dealgan, "Dalgan's dún").

Location
Dundalk Upper is found in north County Louth, containing the valleys of the Castletown River and River Fane.

Dundalk Upper is bordered to the east by Dundalk Lower, to the south by Louth, to the west by Farney, County Monaghan, and to the north by Orior Upper and Fews Upper, County Armagh.

History
Dundalk Upper was formed from Uí Mac Uais Breg, the country of the Mac Scanlans. The barony of Dundalk was the ancient home of the Conaille Muirtheimhne. The barony was split in half by 1821.

Civil Parishes 
There are 14 civil parishes.

 Ballybarrack (6 townlands)
 Barronstown (14 townlands)
 Castletown (8 townlands)
 Creggan (10 townlands)
 Dunbin (9 townlands)
 Dundalk (21 townlands)
 Faughart (4 townlands)
 Haggardstown (1 townlands)
 Haynestown (3 townlands)
 Inishkeen (35 townlands)
 Kane (5 townlands)
 Louth (87 townlands)
 Philipstown (4 townlands)
 Roche (11 townlands)

Townlands 
There are 118 townlands.

 Acarreagh, Castletown Civil Parish, Barony of Upper Dundalk, Co. Louth
 Allardstown, Dunbin Civil Parish, Barony of Upper Dundalk, Co. Louth
 Annaghvacky, Creggan Civil Parish, Barony of Upper Dundalk, Co. Louth
 Balbobin, Barronstown Civil Parish, Barony of Upper Dundalk, Co. Louth
 Ballinfuil, Roche Civil Parish, Barony of Upper Dundalk, Co. Louth
 Ballinlough, Louth Civil Parish, Barony of Upper Dundalk, Co. Louth
 Ballinurd, Barronstown Civil Parish, Barony of Upper Dundalk, Co. Louth
 Ballybarrack, Ballybarrack Civil Parish, Barony of Upper Dundalk, Co. Louth
 Ballybinaby, Roche Civil Parish, Barony of Upper Dundalk, Co. Louth
 Balregan, Castletown Civil Parish, Barony of Upper Dundalk, Co. Louth
 Balriggan, Barony of Upper Dundalk, Co. Louth
 Barronstown, Barronstown Civil Parish, Barony of Upper Dundalk, Co. Louth
 Cambrickville, Dundalk Civil Parish, Barony of Upper Dundalk, Co. Louth
 Carnanbregagh, Ballybarrack Civil Parish, Barony of Upper Dundalk, Co. Louth
 Carn Beg, Dundalk Civil Parish, Barony of Upper Dundalk, Co. Louth
 Carn More, Dundalk Civil Parish, Barony of Upper Dundalk, Co. Louth
 Carnroe, Dunbin Civil Parish, Barony of Upper Dundalk, Co. Louth
 Carracloghan, Inishkeen Civil Parish, Barony of Upper Dundalk, Co. Louth
 Carrans Park (Tates and Carrans Park), Dunbin Civil Parish, Barony of Upper Dundalk, Co. Louth)
 Carrickalust, Barronstown Civil Parish, Barony of Upper Dundalk, Co. Louth
 Carrickastuck, Philipstown Civil Parish, Barony of Upper Dundalk, Co. Louth
 Carrickedmond, Faughart Civil Parish, Barony of Upper Dundalk, Co. Louth
 Carrickrobin, Barronstown Civil Parish, Barony of Upper Dundalk, Co. Louth
 Castletown, Castletown Civil Parish, Barony of Upper Dundalk, Co. Louth
 Cavan, Barony of Upper Dundalk, Co. Louth
 Cavananore, Creggan Civil Parish, Barony of Upper Dundalk, Co. Louth
 Clonaleenaghan, Creggan Civil Parish, Barony of Upper Dundalk, Co. Louth
 Courtbane, Creggan Civil Parish, Barony of Upper Dundalk, Co. Louth
 Crumlin, Dundalk Civil Parish, Barony of Upper Dundalk, Co. Louth
 Cunnicar, Barronstown Civil Parish, Barony of Upper Dundalk, Co. Louth
 Deerpark, Philipstown Civil Parish, Barony of Upper Dundalk, Co. Louth
 Demesne, Dundalk Civil Parish, Barony of Upper Dundalk, Co. Louth
 Derryfalone, Barronstown Civil Parish, Barony of Upper Dundalk, Co. Louth
 Donaghmore, Dunbin Civil Parish, Barony of Upper Dundalk, Co. Louth
 Dowdallshill, Dundalk Civil Parish, Barony of Upper Dundalk, Co. Louth
 Drumbilla, Roche Civil Parish, Barony of Upper Dundalk, Co. Louth
 Drumsinnot, Inishkeen Civil Parish, Barony of Upper Dundalk, Co. Louth
 Ducavan, Roche Civil Parish, Barony of Upper Dundalk, Co. Louth
 Dunbin, Dunbin Civil Parish, Barony of Upper Dundalk, Co. Louth
 Dunbin Little, Dunbin Civil Parish, Barony of Upper Dundalk, Co. Louth
 Dungooly, Faughart Civil Parish, Barony of Upper Dundalk, Co. Louth
 Dunmahon, Haynestown Civil Parish, Barony of Upper Dundalk, Co. Louth
 East Shortstone, Roche Civil Parish, Barony of Upper Dundalk, Co. Louth)
 Edenagrena, Inishkeen Civil Parish, Barony of Upper Dundalk, Co. Louth
 Edenakill, Roche Civil Parish, Barony of Upper Dundalk, Co. Louth
 Fairhill, Dundalk Civil Parish, Barony of Upper Dundalk, Co. Louth
 Falmore, Roche Civil Parish, Barony of Upper Dundalk, Co. Louth
 Farrandreg, Castletown Civil Parish, Barony of Upper Dundalk, Co. Louth
 Gibstown, Louth Civil Parish, Barony of Upper Dundalk, Co. Louth
 Glebe, Barronstown Civil Parish, Barony of Upper Dundalk, Co. Louth
 Glebe Bog, Barronstown Civil Parish, Barony of Upper Dundalk, Co. Louth
 Glebe (E.D. Dundalk Rural), Dundalk Civil Parish, Barony of Upper Dundalk, Co. Louth
 Gorteen, Inishkeen Civil Parish, Barony of Upper Dundalk, Co. Louth
 Haggardstown, Haggardstown Civil Parish, Barony of Upper Dundalk, Co. Louth
 Haynestown, Haynestown Civil Parish, Barony of Upper Dundalk, Co. Louth
 Kane, Kane Civil Parish, Barony of Upper Dundalk, Co. Louth
 Kilcurly, Dunbin Civil Parish, Barony of Upper Dundalk, Co. Louth
 Kilcurry, Barony of Upper Dundalk, Co. Louth
 Killaconner, Inishkeen Civil Parish, Barony of Upper Dundalk, Co. Louth
 Killally, Ballybarrack Civil Parish, Barony of Upper Dundalk, Co. Louth
 Killin, Kane Civil Parish, Barony of Upper Dundalk, Co. Louth
 Killyclessy, Creggan Civil Parish, Barony of Upper Dundalk, Co. Louth
 Knockagh, Kane Civil Parish, Barony of Upper Dundalk, Co. Louth
 Knockatavy, Louth Civil Parish, Barony of Upper Dundalk, Co. Louth
 Knockattin, Louth Civil Parish, Barony of Upper Dundalk, Co. Louth
 Knockcor, Dunbin Civil Parish, Barony of Upper Dundalk, Co. Louth
 Lacknareagh, Barronstown Civil Parish, Barony of Upper Dundalk, Co. Louth
 Lisdoo, Dundalk Civil Parish, Barony of Upper Dundalk, Co. Louth
 Lisnawully, Dundalk Civil Parish, Barony of Upper Dundalk, Co. Louth
 Littlemill, Ballybarrack Civil Parish, Barony of Upper Dundalk, Co. Louth
 Loughantarve, Louth Civil Parish, Barony of Upper Dundalk, Co. Louth
 Lower Marshes, Dundalk Civil Parish, Barony of Upper Dundalk, Co. Louth)
 Lurgankeel, Faughart Civil Parish, Barony of Upper Dundalk, Co. Louth
 Maghereagh, Barronstown Civil Parish, Barony of Upper Dundalk, Co. Louth
 Marshes Lower, Dundalk Civil Parish, Barony of Upper Dundalk, Co. Louth
 Marshes Upper, Dundalk Civil Parish, Barony of Upper Dundalk, Co. Louth
 Marsh North, Dundalk Civil Parish, Barony of Upper Dundalk, Co. Louth
 Marsh South, Dundalk Civil Parish, Barony of Upper Dundalk, Co. Louth
 Millpark, Louth Civil Parish, Barony of Upper Dundalk, Co. Louth
 Milltown, Barronstown Civil Parish, Barony of Upper Dundalk, Co. Louth
 Milltown Bog, Barronstown Civil Parish, Barony of Upper Dundalk, Co. Louth
 Moorland, Dundalk Civil Parish, Barony of Upper Dundalk, Co. Louth
 Mounthamilton, Dundalk Civil Parish, Barony of Upper Dundalk, Co. Louth
 Mullagharlin, Dundalk Civil Parish, Barony of Upper Dundalk, Co. Louth
 Newtownbabe, Ballybarrack Civil Parish, Barony of Upper Dundalk, Co. Louth
 Newtownbalregan, Castletown Civil Parish, Barony of Upper Dundalk, Co. Louth
 Newtownfane, Louth Civil Parish, Barony of Upper Dundalk, Co. Louth
 North Marsh, Dundalk Civil Parish, Barony of Upper Dundalk, Co. Louth)
 Philipstown, Philipstown Civil Parish, Barony of Upper Dundalk, Co. Louth
 Plaster, Barronstown Civil Parish, Barony of Upper Dundalk, Co. Louth
 Point, Dundalk Civil Parish, Barony of Upper Dundalk, Co. Louth
 Priorland, Dundalk Civil Parish, Barony of Upper Dundalk, Co. Louth
 Rallinclare, Louth Civil Parish, Barony of Upper Dundalk, Co. Louth
 Raskeagh, Faughart Civil Parish, Barony of Upper Dundalk, Co. Louth
 Rassan, Creggan Civil Parish, Barony of Upper Dundalk, Co. Louth
 Rath, Ballybarrack Civil Parish, Barony of Upper Dundalk, Co. Louth
 Rathduff, Roche Civil Parish, Barony of Upper Dundalk, Co. Louth
 Rathiddy, Louth Civil Parish, Barony of Upper Dundalk, Co. Louth
 Rathmore, Philipstown Civil Parish, Barony of Upper Dundalk, Co. Louth
 Rathroal, Haynestown Civil Parish, Barony of Upper Dundalk, Co. Louth
 Roche, Barony of Upper Dundalk, Co. Louth
 Rossmackay, Louth Civil Parish, Barony of Upper Dundalk, Co. Louth
 Shanmullagh, Creggan Civil Parish, Barony of Upper Dundalk, Co. Louth
 Sheelagh, Creggan Civil Parish, Barony of Upper Dundalk, Co. Louth
 Shortstone East, Roche Civil Parish, Barony of Upper Dundalk, Co. Louth
 Shortstone West, Roche Civil Parish, Barony of Upper Dundalk, Co. Louth
 Slieve, Kane Civil Parish, Barony of Upper Dundalk, Co. Louth
 South Marsh, Dundalk Civil Parish, Barony of Upper Dundalk, Co. Louth)
 Sportsman's Hall, Dundalk Civil Parish, Barony of Upper Dundalk, Co. Louth
 Stephenstown, Louth Civil Parish, Barony of Upper Dundalk, Co. Louth
 Stranacarry, Castletown Civil Parish, Barony of Upper Dundalk, Co. Louth
 Stumpa, Kane Civil Parish, Barony of Upper Dundalk, Co. Louth
 Tankardsrock, Castletown Civil Parish, Barony of Upper Dundalk, Co. Louth
 Tatebane, Roche Civil Parish, Barony of Upper Dundalk, Co. Louth
 Tateetra, Castletown Civil Parish, Barony of Upper Dundalk, Co. Louth
 Tates and Carrans Park, Dunbin Civil Parish, Barony of Upper Dundalk, Co. Louth
 Tatnadarra, Roche Civil Parish, Barony of Upper Dundalk, Co. Louth
 Tattynaskeagh, Inishkeen Civil Parish, Barony of Upper Dundalk, Co. Louth
 Tawnamore, Creggan Civil Parish, Barony of Upper Dundalk, Co. Louth
 Thomastown, Dunbin Civil Parish, Barony of Upper Dundalk, Co. Louth
 Thornfield, Inishkeen Civil Parish, Barony of Upper Dundalk, Co. Louth
 Toprass, Inishkeen Civil Parish, Barony of Upper Dundalk, Co. Louth
 Townparks, Dundalk Civil Parish, Barony of Upper Dundalk, Co. Louth
 Treagh, Creggan Civil Parish, Barony of Upper Dundalk, Co. Louth
 Upper Marshes, Dundalk Civil Parish, Barony of Upper Dundalk, Co. Louth
 West Shortstone, Roche Civil Parish, Barony of Upper Dundalk, Co. Louth

References

Baronies of County Louth